List of Ukrainian people in football who plays or played in Russian occupied territories of Ukraine include players, coaches, and functionaries who play, coach or develop football in Crimea and the Russian occupied areas of Ukrainian Donbas (Donetsk and Luhansk oblasts).

Crimea

Players

 Oleksandr Zhobokrytskyi
 Anton Holekov
 Yevhen Bredun
 Anton Monakhov
 Anton Shevchuk
 Oleksiy Kurylov
 Artur Novotryasov
 Arsen Ablyametov
 Andriy Haidash
 Artem Kultyshev
 Yevhen Odintsov
 Stanislav Pechenkin
 Vladyslav Hevlych
 Andriy Kiva
 Roman Klymentovskyi
 Redvan Memeshev
 Matviy Bobal
 Serhiy Naumenko
 Petro Oparin
 Redvan Osmanov
 Oleh Solovych
 Serhiy Ferenchak
 Oleksiy Yablonskyi
 Illya Hlushchytskyi
 Pavlo Hryshchenko
 Artur Zhyhulin
 Volodymyr Melnychenko
 Oleksandr Morev
 Maksym Prykhodnyi
 Vyacheslav Bazylevych
 Yuriy Pantya
 Ihor Buryak
 Ihor Zubko
 Oleksiy Hodin
 Illya Kozhemyakin
 Dmytro Khodarchenko
 Serhiy Shestakov (footballer, born 1994)
 Ivan Voitenko
 Dlyaver Nuridinov
 Denys Sytnikov
 Stepan Borhun
 Andriy Zborovskyi
 Ihor Solntsev
 Maksym Khablov
 Mykyta Kryukov
 Denys Danyuk
 Oleksandr Zeynalov
 Oleh Humenyuk
 Anton Shendrik
 Taras Chervonetskyi

Coaches and functionaries
 Anatoliy Skvortsov
 Stanislav Hudzikevych
 Spartak Zhyhulin
 Oleh Kolesov
 Andriy Yudin
 Oleksandr Haidash
 Yuriy Svirkov
 Oleksiy Hrachev
 Vladyslav Maltsev
 Roman Voinarovskyi
 Enver Seidametov

Donetsk Oblast
 Serhiy Artiukh

Luhansk Oblast
 Andriy Komarytskyi

See also
 Crimean Premier League

References

External links
 Artur Valerko. I did not break a law by playing in the Crimean championship. Sport Arena. 28 February 2019

Association football player non-biographical articles